His Honour Ifor Bowen Lloyd (9 September 1902 – 23 July 1990), was a British Judge and Liberal Party politician.

Background
Lloyd was elder son of the Rev. Thomas Davies Lloyd, who was the Vicar of Cricklewood and Mrs Margaret Lloyd. He was educated at Winchester and Exeter College, Oxford where he received a BA in Modern History in 1924. While at Oxford he was a member of the Library Committee of the Oxford Union Society. In 1938 he married Naomi Bancroft. They had one son and one daughter. His brother was John Emrys Lloyd.

Professional career
Lloyd was called to Bar by the Inner Temple in 1925. He became a King's Counsel in 1951. He became a County Court Judge. He was appointed a Bencher in 1959, and worked as a Circuit Judge. From 1964 to 1976 he was Judge of Wandsworth County Court.

Political career
Lloyd was Liberal candidate for the Burton division of Staffordshire at the 1929 General Election. He was Liberal candidate for the Chertsey division of Surrey at the 1931 General Election. He did not stand for parliament again.

Electoral record

References

1902 births
1990 deaths
Liberal Party (UK) parliamentary candidates
People educated at Winchester College
Alumni of Exeter College, Oxford
Members of the Inner Temple
English King's Counsel
County Court judges (England and Wales)